Nicola Zingarelli (August 28, 1860 — June 6, 1935) was an Italian philologist, the founder of the Zingarelli Italian dictionary.

He was born in Cerignola (Apulia) and died in Milan.

External links
 

1860 births
1935 deaths
Italian philologists
People from Cerignola